Alfred A. Cohn (March 26, 1880 – February 3, 1951) was an American author, journalist and newspaper editor, Police Commissioner, and screenwriter of the 1920s and 1930s. He is best remembered for his work on The Jazz Singer, which was nominated for (but did not win) an Academy Award for Best Adapted Screenplay in the 1st Academy Awards of 1929.

Cohn was born in Freeport, Illinois but subsequently moved to Cleveland, Ohio where he began work as a newspaper editor and journalist. He then moved to Galveston, Texas where he ran a newspaper.

Following his career in journalism, he moved to Arizona and participated as a secretary in the Arizona constitutional convention which led to its statehood in 1912.

In the 1920s, he moved to Los Angeles, California and began working as a writer, first doing title cards for silent films and, later, scripts and adaptations. He was a co-writer on the 1926 film The Cohens and Kellys, the first of the six-film Cohens and Kellys franchise. His work on adapting The Jazz Singer, one of the first motion pictures with sound, from a play and short story by Samson Raphaelson, led to his first and only nomination for an Academy Award. During this period, he was a prolific writer and wrote more than 100 scripts, roughly 40 of which were produced into films.

In the 1930s, he retired from screenwriting and was appointed the Police Commissioner of Los Angeles, and he continued writing as a short story writer. He died of a heart condition in 1951.

Partial filmography

 Jazzmania (1923)
 The Unknown Purple (1923)
 The Drums of Jeopardy (1923)
 Fashion Row (1924)
 Half-A-Dollar-Bill (1924)
 In Fast Company (1924)
 The Legend of Hollywood (1924)
 Which Shall It Be? (1924)
 Friendly Enemies (1925)
 The Cohens and Kellys (1926)
 The Midnight Kiss (1926)
 Flames (1926)
 Frisco Sally Levy (1927)
 The Cat and the Canary (1927)
 The Jazz Singer (1927)
 The Cohens and the Kellys in Paris (1928)
 We Americans (1928)
 The Last Warning (1928)
 The Carnation Kid (1929)
 Divorce Made Easy (1929)
 Always Faithful (1929)
 Numbered Men (1930)
 Sweethearts on Parade (1930)
 A Holy Terror (1931)
 Mystery Ranch (1932)
 Son of a Sailor (1933)
 Harold Teen (1934)

External links

1880 births
1951 deaths
Burials at Hollywood Forever Cemetery
American male screenwriters
Commissioners of the Los Angeles Police Department
People from Freeport, Illinois
Screenwriters from Illinois
20th-century American male writers
20th-century American screenwriters